Morton Sundour Fabrics Limited was a British textile manufacturer based at Dentonhill, Carlisle, England. In 1980 it was called "one of Britain's major textile firms". It ceased trading in November 1996.

It was founded in 1914, by Alexander Morton who reorganised his Alexander Morton and Company Ltd, with Morton Sundour as "the major off-shoot". It was run by his second son James Morton.

They were particularly known for their furnishing fabrics.

Some of their fabrics are in the collection of the Victoria and Albert Museum, London.

People who created designs for them included George Henry Walton and Minnie McLeish.

References

British companies established in 1914
Textile manufacturers of England
1914 establishments in England
1996 disestablishments in England
Textile companies of the United Kingdom
Defunct manufacturing companies of England
Manufacturing companies disestablished in 1996
Companies based in Cumbria
Cotton industry in England
Former textile mills in the United Kingdom